Theobalds House (also known as Theobalds Palace) in the parish of Cheshunt in the English county of Hertfordshire, north of London, was a significant stately home and (later) royal palace of the 16th and early 17th centuries. 

Set in extensive parkland, it was a residence of statesmen Lord Burghley and his son, both leading royal advisers. James I enjoyed staying so much he acquired it from the Cecil family, further extending house and park. It was a notable example of the Elizabethan prodigy house, but was demolished as a result of the English Civil War.

A new mansion known as The Cedars was built farther to the west in 1763: the house and park were then acquired and the house extended by millionaire brewers the Meux family. London's Temple Bar Gate was preserved and stood in the park from 1880 to 2003, when it was moved back to London. The mansion, which became Middlesex County Council Secondary School and then Theobalds Park College, is now part of a hotel and members club known as Birch; the house is a Grade II* listed building.

Early history 
The manor was originally called Cullynges, later Tongs (after William de Tongge), and since 1440, Thebaudes, Tibbolds, and finally Theobalds. The original manor house was surrounded by a moat. In 1563, it was bought by William Cecil, 1st Baron Burghley, senior councillor of Queen Elizabeth I. He entertained Elizabeth in this house on several occasions.

Fit for a Queen
Lord Burghley commissioned a grand new house, which was built between 1564 and 1585. Burghley's intention in building the mansion was partly to demonstrate his increasingly dominant status at the Royal Court, and also to provide a palace fine enough to accommodate the Queen on her visits. The Queen visited eight times between 1572 and 1596. The location was ideal in that it lay just off the main road north from London to Ware, a 2.5 hour horse trot journey from London, and thus an ideal stop at the end of the first day of a royal tour. A list of rooms to be prepared for the royal visit in 1572 survives.

The formal gardens of the house were modelled after the Château de Fontainebleau in France, the English botanist, John Gerard, acting as their superintendent. A plan for rebuilding the inner or conduit court in 1572 was made by Henry Hawthorne, who was a "purveyor" in the royal works. In 1582, brass figures called "terms" were supplied for the Great Chamber fireplace and the windows were glazed with heraldry. There was a water feature, six artificial trees, and the ceiling was decorated with the signs of the zodiac. The great staircase with its oak carvings, similar those at Hatfield House, was salvaged and eventually installed at Herstmonceux Castle. Another schedule of rooms and lodgings was drawn up in May 1583, when Elizabeth stayed for a week at Theobalds and was reconciled with the Earl of Oxford. Elizabeth came in May 1591 and an entertainment the Hermit's Welcome at Theobalds was performed.

Visitors would first enter the Great Hall. It was two storeys high, with oak panelling and a minstrels' gallery. The hall ceiling was arched over "with curved timber of curious workmanship" and may have resembled the slightly later decorative hammerbeams of the Great Hall at Wollaton. The chimneypiece was carved from blue marble. In 1585 a painter called Jenings drew the heraldry of the peers of England on the wall and provided a frame for a map, the "chart of England".

The Painted, or Green Gallery, completed in 1574 ran over a wing of lodgings and bedchambers. The decoration of the Green Gallery was also of a topographic and heraldic character. It was described by a German visitor, Jacob Rathgeb, secretary to the Duke of Wirtemberg, who visited in 1592, and the Baron Waldstein in 1600. Frederic Gerschow, secretary to the Duke of Stettin-Pomerania, saw the hall in 1602 and explained that England was represented by 52 "trees", a tree for each province hung with arms of the earls and barons. There were also token items depicting the produce of the regions. Paul Hentzner mentioned a canal in the garden for visitors to row boats amidst the shrubbery.

Two thieves, John Todd alias Black Jack and Thomas Travers got into the Queen's privy chambers and stole an inkstand and two silver bowls in September 1597. They were caught and executed. Burghley employed the London goldsmith Richard Martin to recover the silver they had sold. Lord Burghley's younger son, Robert Cecil, 1st Earl of Salisbury, inherited the house. The Earl of Northumberland paid him a compliment, writing that for planning his own new house he was going to look at Copthall and as a builder he "must borrow of knowledge somewhat out of Tibballs, somewhat out of every place of mark where curiosities are used.

King James and Theobalds

After the Queen's death in 1603, Robert Cecil arranged for the new king, James I, to stay on his way from Scotland to London, and receive homage from the Privy Council. The king was troubled by the dust of the entrance road or drive, and an alternative route was made through the lands of Cheshunt Park and Peryours. James wrote to Cecil to provide stags for him to hunt in the woods and park of Theobalds in the autumn of 1604. Fulke Greville came to Theobalds in May 1605 to report on Salisbury's horses and survey the lake and islands in the park. Greville suggested enlarging some windows in one of the galleries of the house.

In July 1606, Cecil again entertained King James and his brother-in-law, King Christian IV of Denmark, at Theobalds, while Anne of Denmark stayed at Greenwich. Both monarchs were notoriously heavy drinkers, and according to Sir John Harington, the occasion was simply an orgy of drunkenness, as few English or Danish courtiers had their rulers' capacity to hold their drink: an attempt to put on a masque of Solomon and Sheba descended into a farce, as most of the players were too inebriated to remember their lines, or even to stand up. The five-day visit cost Cecil £1,180 including presents worth £284. Cecil paid Inigo Jones £23 for making and designing the masque scenery. Doubts have been expressed about the details in Harington's description of the masque.

In 1607, King James I acquired Theobalds in exchange for Hatfield Palace, also in Hertfordshire. James gave Theobalds to Anne of Denmark in 1607, and this formality was the occasion of court festivities in May 1607 involving hunting, tournaments, and the Prince de Joinville. James ordered improvements, and it quickly became his favourite country residence. 

The house had some disadvantages compared with other aristocrats'  houses. Although James declared in 1607 that it was "a fitting place for our sports", Godfrey Goodman noted that it had no "lordship nor tenants, nor so much as provision of fuel, only a park for pleasure and no more". In 1624, Prince Charles wrote "there is no kind of field-hawking there". Theobalds was however conveniently near to Waltham Forest where the king could hunt. In July 1613 Anne of Denmark was hunting deer at Theobalds and accidentally shot and killed the king's dog "Jewel" with a crossbow bolt. King James invited a young Polish-Lithuanian nobleman Tomasz Zamoyski to join the hunt at Theobalds in July 1615.

In September 1618 James gave orders for the demolition of two new buildings nearby that housed tobacco shops patronised by his courtiers. He also ordered the keeper of the gardens, Munten Jennings, to build a house to keep silkworms and feed them mulberry leaves. On 9 January 1622 King James rode from Theobalds after dinner to see the ice on the New River and fell in head first so that his companions could only see his boots. He was rescued by Sir Richard Young and returned to a warm bed at Theobalds. A new pool with a barge and barge house was created in the gardens in 1622. The ambassador Diego Sarmiento de Acuña, 1st Count of Gondomar arranged for the gift of two camels and a breeding pair of asses to be sent from Spain for the park in 1622.

King James died at Theobalds on 27 March 1625. The Knight Marshal, Edward Zouch proclaimed King Charles at Theobalds gate. James had made few changes to the main suites, installing panelling in the Great Gallery to which his son Charles I added a number of carved and painted stag's heads. Later, after the execution of Charles I, Theobalds was listed, amongst other royal properties, for demolition and disposal by the Commonwealth. This was achieved speedily, and by the end of 1650, the house was largely demolished. After the Restoration, the estate was granted to George Monck, 1st Duke of Albemarle, but reverted to the Crown after the death of the 2nd Duke of Albemarle, who left no heir.

Eighteenth and nineteenth centuries: the new house

It was then given by King William III to William Bentinck, 1st Earl of Portland and descended in that family until sold in 1762 by 3rd Duke of Portland to George Prescott, a merchant and MP. Prescott built a Georgian style mansion known as The Cedars about a mile to the west of the original palace.The new house passed from the Prescott family to the Meux family of Meux's Brewery fame in about 1820, and they made extensive alterations and added extensions during the nineteenth century. These included a remodelled entrance based on Sir Christopher Wren's Temple Bar, which had been dismantled and stored in a yard at Farringdon Road. In 1888, it caught the eye of the beautiful (painted by Whistler) and eccentric Lady Meux (formerly a banjo-playing barmaid named Val); the gateway was purchased from the City of London and the 400 tons of stone was transported by horse-drawn carts to the park, where it was carefully rebuilt at a cost of £10,000. Lady Val Meux often entertained in the gateway's upper chamber; guests included King Edward VII and Winston Churchill.

Later history 
When Sir Hedworth Lambton, the commander of the Naval Brigade at the siege of Ladysmith, returned to England, he called on Lady Meux at Theobalds to recount his adventures. She was so taken with him that she made him the chief beneficiary of her will, on condition that he change his surname to Meux (she was without direct heirs, and had been snubbed by her husband's family). When she died on 20 December 1910, he willingly changed his name by Royal Warrrant and inherited the Hertfordshire estate and a substantial interest in the Meux Brewery.

In 1921 part of the park, the site of the demolished Elizabethan mansion, was given to the town of Cheshunt by Meux and a public park, The Cedars, created. After his death in 1929, the house was a hotel for some years. During World War II, the house was used by the Royal Artillery and then by the Metropolitan Police as a riding school. Renamed to Theobalds House, in 1955 it became a secondary school and after 1969, an adult education centre. In the 1990s it was refurbished for use as a commercial conference centre and later converted to its current (2015) status as the Theobalds Park Hotel in the De Vere Venues chain.

The Temple Bar had remained in the hands of the trustees of the Meux family estate and despite its status as a Scheduled Ancient Monument, had lapsed into decay. After a long campaign, it was decided to return it to the City in 2001. The arch was again dismantled,  and was reconstructed on a site next to St Paul's Cathedral. The project was completed in November 2004, and a commemorative plaque was placed in Theobalds Park.

References
 Emily Cole, "Theobalds, Hertfordshire: The Plan and Interiors of an Elizabethan Country House", Architectural History, 60 (2017), pp. 71–117.
 John Summerson, "The Building of Theobalds, 1564-1585", Archaeologia, 97 (1959), pp. 107–126

External links
 Theobalds Palace 

1585 establishments in England
Houses completed in 1585
Country houses in Hertfordshire
Royal residences in England
Grade II* listed buildings in Hertfordshire
Scheduled monuments in Hertfordshire
Cheshunt
Cecil family
Demolished buildings and structures in England
James VI and I
Anne of Denmark
George Monck, 1st Duke of Albemarle